King Faisal Football Club is a professional association football club based in Kumasi, Ashanti, Ghana. The club competes in the Glo Premier League. They were represented at the 2006 FIFA World Cup by left-back Habib Mohamed. The club have never won the Ghana Premier League.

The club was named by its owner Alhaji Grunsah after King Faisal.

Achievements
Ghana Top Four Cup: 1
 2004

Performance in CAF competitions
CAF Confederation Cup: 3 appearances
2004 – Second Round
2005 – Group Stage
2006 – First Round

Current squad
as of 11 December 2021

Managers
 Nana whyte (1998-2001)
 Hans-Dieter Schmidt (2003–04)
 Steven Polack (2007–09)
 Zdravko Logarušić (2009–10)
 Miroslav Buljan (2011)
 Stephen Agburi (2012)
 Mallam Yahaya (2012–2013)
 Dorian Marin (2014)

References

Football clubs in Ghana
Sports clubs in Ghana
Kumasi